TerraPass is a social enterprise that provides carbon offsetting products. They are headquartered in Houston, Texas. TerraPass use proceeds from member purchases to fund greenhouse gas reduction projects.

Carbon portfolio
TerraPass's portfolio of carbon reduction projects is divided into four project types, all based in the United States:

Wind energy. TerraPass purchased Green-e-certified wind Renewable Energy Certificates (RECs) from wind farms and calculates the carbon reduction from these RECs based on the EPA eGRID methodology. Wind farms help reduce greenhouse gas emissions by displacing electricity that would otherwise come from burning fossil fuels such as coal.

Farm methane digesters (or "Farm Power"). TerraPass funds emissions reductions from digesters that collect the methane from animal manure on dairy farms and burn it, often generating renewable energy (the heat energy from burning methane can be used to generate electricity; the manure, as the source of methane, is the 'renewable') in the process. Methane is a greenhouse gas with a global warming potential of about 23 times that of carbon dioxide (the combustion of methane produces carbon dioxide).

Landfill methane flaring. TerraPass funds reductions from landfill flaring of methane, a method similar to farm methane digesters, in which the methane is instead collected from decomposing garbage.

Clean energy. TerraPass funds wind energy after calculating environmental gains with the “carbon profile” of the electricity grid where the energy is produced.

History

Acquisition by Just Energy Group 
In 2014, TerraPass sold its retail carbon offset business to JustGreen, a subsidiary of the Just Energy Group Inc., a Canada-based competitive retailer of natural gas and electricity. JustGreen assumed the TerraPass brand. The remaining TerraPass Energy & Wholesale group renamed itself Origin Climate.

Partnerships 
To expand their reach into additional areas of the carbon offset market, TerraPass has entered into several business partnerships:
 In August 2006, TerraPass began selling airplane emission offsets through Expedia.  In contrast to offsets sold through TerraPass's website, Expedia offsets are intended to offset the specific flight(s) booked through the travel site.
 In January 2007, TerraPass partnered with uShip.com to provide a "TerraPass Certified Green Provider Program" to shipping companies wishing to offset their carbon dioxide emissions.
 In June 2007, Flexcar partnered with TerraPass to provide a premium "Green Membership". In addition to regular Flexcar privileges, Green members receive one ton of CO2 offsets through TerraPass.

Verification
TerraPass works directly with project developers to validate the greenhouse gas reductions against the Verified Carbon Standard, a leading offset standard. All of the RECs TerraPass purchases are Green-e certified through the Center for Resource Solutions. The primary standards they use are Verified Carbon Standard and the Climate Action Reserve.

TerraPass is audited according to guidelines established by the Center for Resource Solutions. The audit covers a number of aspects of the company's operations. The focus of the audit is to verify that TerraPass fulfills its carbon purchase obligations on behalf of its customers; to enforce certain carbon portfolio quality standards; and to review TerraPass marketing language and disclosure policies for accuracy.

Adam Stein, co-founder and VP of Marketing, was an occasional contributor to environmental news site Grist Magazine.

Quality principles
The voluntary carbon market is a young but rapidly growing industry, achieving worldwide sales of approximately $100 million in 2006. The industry has experienced a number of controversies, some of which TerraPass has attempted to address:  
 Consumer behavior. TerraPass conducted a survey of its customers and found that they are far more likely than average Americans to reduce their carbon footprint through a variety of means, including conservation. For example, 26% of TerraPass customers take public transportation to work, five times the national average.
 Quality. TerraPass addresses additionality and other concerns by putting projects through a public review process which covers project details, environmental impacts, and additionality.
 Standards. All TerraPass projects are validated according to third-party standards, such as the Voluntary Carbon Standard.
 Tree-planting projects. TerraPass does not fund tree-planting projects, focusing exclusively on projects in which the carbon reductions are real, immediate, permanent, and verifiable.

TerraPass is an active contributor to standards development, and recently testified before the House Select Committee on Energy Independence and Global Warming, a congressional committee focused on climate change and energy independence. During his testimony, TerraPass CEO Erik Blachford called for governmental involvement in standards for the carbon offset industry.

References

External links
TerraPass

Climate change organizations based in the United States
Companies based in San Francisco